Irwi Johansson (born 12 July 1954) is a Swedish former swimmer. She competed in the women's 4 × 100 metre freestyle relay at the 1972 Summer Olympics.

References

External links
 

1954 births
Living people
Swedish female freestyle swimmers
Olympic swimmers of Sweden
Swimmers at the 1972 Summer Olympics
Swimmers from Gothenburg
20th-century Swedish women
21st-century Swedish women